Methylmalonate semialdehyde dehydrogenase may refer to:
 Methylmalonate-semialdehyde dehydrogenase (acylating)
 ALDH6A1